Andrea Lutzu (born 18 December 1962 in Oristano) is an Italian politician.

He is a member of the centre-right party Forza Italia. He was elected Mayor of Oristano on 25 June 2017 and took office on 26 June.

See also
2017 Italian local elections
List of mayors of Oristano

References

External links
 

1962 births
Living people
Mayors of Oristano
Forza Italia (2013) politicians